UCV may refer to:

University of Craiova
 Universitatea Craiova, a football team named after and initially run by the University of Craiova
Central University of Venezuela, or "Universidad Central de Venezuela" in Spanish
Cesar Vallejo University, or "Universidad César Vallejo" in Spanish
UCV Television
United Confederate Veterans
Club Deportivo Universidad César Vallejo